Brianna Miller (born 18 September 1991) is a Canadian rugby union player.

Miller competed for Canada at the delayed 2021 Rugby World Cup in New Zealand. She was later ruled out for the remainder of the World Cup after she sustained significant internal injuries in the match against Italy; she had scored two tries in Canada's opening match against Japan.

References

External links 

 Brianna Miller at Rugby Canada

1991 births
Living people
Female rugby union players
Canadian female rugby union players
Canada women's international rugby union players